SWR may refer to:

Radio and television
 Standing wave ratio, in radio-engineering a measure of impedance matching of loads

Broadcasters
 Scandinavian Weekend Radio, Virrat, Finland
 South West Radio, former broadcaster, England
 Südwestrundfunk, German radio and television broadcaster
 SWR Symphonieorchester, a radio orchestra affiliated with Südwestrundfunk
 SWR Vokalensemble, the vocal ensemble of Südwestrundfunk
 SWR FM, former name of the SWR Triple 9 FM radio broadcaster, Sydney, Australia
 SWR Fernsehen, a German regional television channel

People
 Simeon Woods Richardson, American baseball player

Transportation

Railway
 South Wales Railway, UK
 South Western Railway (train operating company), England
 South Western Railway zone, India

Airlines
 Swiss International Air Lines (ICAO code), national airline of Switzerland
 Swissair (ICAO code), former national airline of Switzerland

Other uses
 SWR Sound Corporation, guitar amplifier manufacturer
 Saweru language (ISO 639:swr), closely related to Yawa of central Yapen Island, Indonesia
 Scarlet Weather Rhapsody, a game from Touhou Project
 Scotch Whisky Regulations 2009, a UK law
 She Wants Revenge, American rock band

See also
 Glasgow and South Western Railway (G&SWR), a former railway company in Scotland